Pushaw Lake is a shallow, warmwater lake in Penobscot County, Maine, United States about  north of Bangor and  west of Orono. The lake is part of the towns of Orono, Old Town, Hudson, and Glenburn. There are roads and private residences along much of the lake, except the southeastern end where the Caribou Bog complex borders the lake. A small dam was constructed in 1920 at the lake's outflow to maintain constant water levels. The lake's formation and history prior to 1920 remains unclear. The formation of Pushaw Lake was likely caused by glacial melting, however, some locals believe that the lake was greatly expanded in size by flooding or man-made causes at some point in history, explaining the lake's shallow depth.

External links 
Greater Pushaw Lake Association

References

Lakes of Penobscot County, Maine
Glacial lakes of the United States
North Maine Woods
Penobscot River
Reservoirs in Maine